"The Label Maker" is the 98th episode of NBC sitcom Seinfeld. This was the 12th episode for the sixth season. It aired on January 19, 1995. The episode follows a pair of Super Bowl tickets which are repeatedly gifted from one person to another, while Kramer and Newman take drastic steps to keep each other from cheating at Risk and George fears he is competing for his girlfriend's affections with her roommate. The episode popularized the term "regifting".

Plot
Jerry has two tickets to the Super Bowl but cannot attend due to "The Drake's" wedding. Jerry gives the tickets to Dr. Tim Whatley. Elaine and Jerry suspect that Whatley is a "re-gifter" after Whatley, as thanks, gives Jerry the same label maker that Elaine gave Whatley for Christmas. Kramer and Newman are playing an extended game of Risk, leaving the board at Jerry's apartment (Kramer compares Jerry to Switzerland) so that neither of them can tamper with the game.

Kramer informs Jerry that the Drake's wedding is off because he tried to postpone it in favor of the Super Bowl. George suggests Jerry "de-gift" Whatley the tickets, but Whatley has already made plans to go with Newman. Elaine dates Whatley and asks to come up to his apartment in order to find out whether or not he re-gifted her label maker. Whatley de-gifts Newman's ticket and gives it to Elaine. Jerry and George suspect that, due to Elaine's behavior, Whatley invited her purely with the intent of seducing her. When Elaine hints to Whatley that she does not intend to have sex with him on the Super Bowl trip, he gives her ticket back to Jerry.

While talking to Whatley outside, Jerry notices that Kramer's car is being towed. Kramer runs after the tow truck, taking the Risk game board with him so Newman will not cheat, then Newman chases after Kramer to make sure he does not cheat. Continuing their game on the subway en route to the impound lot, Kramer taunts Newman over the fact that most of his remaining troops are in the "weak" nation of Ukraine. A Ukrainian man standing next to them is offended and upends the board, ruining the game.

George is enthralled by the apartment of his new girlfriend, Bonnie, which includes a velvet couch. However, he fears her roommate Scott, who looks just like him, is positioned to become her new boyfriend. He wheedles Bonnie into getting Scott to move out. Using Jerry's label maker to help Bonnie box up Scott's belongings, George discovers that all the things he liked about the apartment, including the couch and the television, belonged to Scott. He asks Bonnie if she is interested in ménage à trois, hoping she will be disgusted and dump him. Instead, she and Scott are eager to have a ménage à trois with George - Scott then advances on a horrified George.

Elaine confronts Whatley about his re-gifting the label maker. He angrily tells her it was defective because the label adhesive was not strong enough. Elaine, upset, reveals she developed feelings for him because of the free dental work he had done on her, and they kiss passionately. The defective labels on Scott's boxes peel off in the mail truck, making them property of the post office, much to Newman's delight.

Now in love with Elaine, Whatley gives up his remaining ticket, resulting in Jerry and Newman sitting together at the Super Bowl.

Production
Writers Alec Berg and Jeff Schaffer came up with multiple endings to the episode's different plot threads. One of the endings considered for the Risk story was a worker at the impound lot giving Newman a strategy that allows him to overcome Kramer's strong lead and win the game. George's subplot was originally to end with Bonnie taking pity on Scott after he loses all his things in the mail, leading her to let him move back in and form a sexual relationship with him, thus fulfilling George's original fear. However, after Berg and Schaffer saw the script for "The Switch" they wanted to do a callback to that episode.

Unlike most Seinfeld episodes, the first draft of the script was taken directly to the table-read without any rewriting from Seinfeld creators Larry David and Jerry Seinfeld, though David and Seinfeld added some material to the script, such as Jerry's comments about repeating the name of a gift and George and Jerry's discussion of how a male roommate has the advantage over a boyfriend.

George's sneeze after Jerry tells him that he blamed him for his party crashing in "The Mom & Pop Store" was unscripted, prompting the director to call "Cut", but it was kept in during the editing phase. Actress Julia Louis-Dreyfus had a bad cold during the filming; since Bryan Cranston had to perform a mouth-to-mouth kiss with her, he came down with the same cold two days later.

Legacy
The script of "The Label Maker" is quoted in the Oxford English Dictionary as the earliest known use of the word "regifter".

The episode's scene on the subway with the conversation about Ukraine became widely popular after the 2022 Russian invasion of Ukraine.

References

External links 
 

Seinfeld (season 6) episodes
1995 American television episodes
2022 Russian invasion of Ukraine in popular culture